Zafar may refer to:

 Zafar (name)
 Zafer Stadı, a multi-purpose stadium in Guzelyurt, Northern Cyprus
 Zafar, Yemen, an ancient Yemeni city
 Zafar, an ancient port city whose main ruins lie in the Al Baleed Archaeological Park
 Zafar (anti-ship missile), an Iranian missile
 Zafar (newspaper), daily newspaper in Iran published between 1944 and 1947
 Battle of Zafar

See also
 Zafer